Middle Inlet is a town in Marinette County, Wisconsin, United States. The population was 831 at the 2000 census. The communities of Sweetheart City and Middle Inlet are located in the town.

Geography
According to the United States Census Bureau, the town has a total area of 51.5 square miles (133.4 km2), of which, 50.7 square miles (131.4 km2) of it is land and 0.8 square miles (2.0 km2) of it (1.50%) is water.

Demographics
As of the census of 2000, there were 831 people, 366 households, and 245 families residing in the town. The population density was 16.4 people per square mile (6.3/km2). There were 643 housing units at an average density of 12.7 per square mile (4.9/km2). The racial makeup of the town was 98.32% White, 0.24% African American, 0.72% Native American, 0.24% Asian, and 0.48% from two or more races. Hispanic or Latino of any race were 0.12% of the population.

There were 366 households, out of which 21.9% had children under the age of 18 living with them, 59.8% were married couples living together, 4.9% had a female householder with no husband present, and 32.8% were non-families. 27.6% of all households were made up of individuals, and 12.6% had someone living alone who was 65 years of age or older. The average household size was 2.27 and the average family size was 2.77.

In the town, the population was spread out, with 19.0% under the age of 18, 5.4% from 18 to 24, 22.3% from 25 to 44, 32.1% from 45 to 64, and 21.2% who were 65 years of age or older. The median age was 46 years. For every 100 females, there were 103.2 males. For every 100 females age 18 and over, there were 105.2 males.

The median income for a household in the town was $32,054, and the median income for a family was $36,750. Males had a median income of $29,808 versus $17,969 for females. The per capita income for the town was $16,082. About 6.1% of families and 9.4% of the population were below the poverty line, including 14.7% of those under age 18 and 8.4% of those age 65 or over.

References

Towns in Marinette County, Wisconsin
Marinette micropolitan area
Towns in Wisconsin